Seppo Saarenpää (born 5 September 1937) is a Finnish former sports shooter. Saarenpää competed at the 1968 Summer Olympics and the 1980 Summer Olympics.

References

1937 births
Living people
Finnish male sport shooters
Olympic shooters of Finland
Shooters at the 1968 Summer Olympics
Shooters at the 1980 Summer Olympics
Sportspeople from Helsinki